John Edward Jones (December 5, 1840 – April 10, 1896) was an American politician. He was the eighth Governor of Nevada. He was a member of the Silver Party.

Biography
Jones was born in Merthyr Tydfil, Wales, and his family moved to Iowa in 1856. His early education was in the common schools of his native Wales. He graduated from the Iowa State University in 1865. He married Elizabeth Weyburn on November 25, 1880, and they had two children, Edith and Arvin.

Career
As a young man, Jones worked as a miner, a farmer, and a teacher. In 1867, he worked on building the Union Pacific Railroad. Settling in Eureka, Nevada in 1869, he was involved in organizing the Nevada Militia in 1876 where he served as Major.

Jones worked mining and agriculture until 1883, when he was appointed Deputy Internal Revenue Collector. From 1886 to 1894, he was Surveyor-General of Nevada, serving two terms.

Jones resigned that post, in 1894 and ran for Governor of Nevada on the Silver Party ticket. He won the election and took office in 1895. During his tenure, irrigation programs were supported and the state's first public library was established in Reno, Nevada. Diagnosed with cancer in the fall of 1895, he took a leave of absence, leaving Lieutenant Governor Reinhold Sadler in his office. He traveled to San Francisco, California to try to heal.

Death
Jones, losing his battle with cancer, died while still holding office on April 10, 1896, in San Francisco at the age of 55. He is interred at Lone Mountain Cemetery, Carson City, Nevada.

References

External links
 
 Biography
 John Edward Jones 1895-1896 at the Nevada State Library and Archives
 Nevada Governors' Biographical Information at the Nevada State Library and Archives

1840 births
1896 deaths
American surveyors
Governors of Nevada
Silver Party state governors of the United States
Democratic Party governors of Nevada
Deaths from cancer in California
Nevada Silverites
19th-century American politicians
People from Merthyr Tydfil
Welsh emigrants to the United States
Iowa State University alumni
People from Eureka, Nevada